Jeffrey Dale Parrett (born August 26, 1961) is an American former Major League Baseball (MLB) pitcher who played for the Montreal Expos (1986–88), Philadelphia Phillies (1989–90 and 1996), Atlanta Braves (1990–91), Oakland Athletics (1992), Colorado Rockies (1993) and St. Louis Cardinals (1995–96).

Career
He graduated from Lafayette High School in Lexington, Kentucky, in 1979.  He then played for University of Kentucky. In 1982, he played collegiate summer baseball with the Wareham Gatemen of the Cape Cod Baseball League and was named a league all-star.

He helped the Braves win the 1991 National League Pennant, the Athletics win the 1992 American League Western Division, and the Cardinals win the 1996 National League Central Division.

In ten years, he had a 56–43 win–loss record and appeared in 491 games (11 starts).

References

External links

1961 births
Living people
American expatriate baseball players in Canada
Atlanta Braves players
Baseball players from Indianapolis
Beloit Brewers players
Colorado Rockies players
Gulf Coast Royals players
Indianapolis Indians players
Kentucky Wildcats baseball players
Major League Baseball pitchers
Montreal Expos players
Oakland Athletics players
Omaha Royals players
Paintsville Brewers players
Philadelphia Phillies players
Richmond Braves players
Stockton Ports players
St. Louis Cardinals players
Wareham Gatemen players
Wilmington Blue Rocks players